Psychology of the Unconscious is an early work of Carl Jung, first published in 1912. The English translation by Beatrice M. Hinkle appeared in 1916 under the full title of Psychology of the Unconscious: a study of the transformations and symbolisms of the libido, a contribution to the history of the evolution of thought (London: Kegan Paul Trench Trubner). Hinkle's translation was reissued in 1992 as supplementary volume B to The Collected Works of C. G. Jung.

In 1952 Jung published a thoroughly revised version of the work, which was translated into English in 1956 as Symbols of Transformation, reissued as volume five of the Collected Works.

The book illustrates a theoretical divergence between Jung and Freud on the nature of the libido, and its publication led to a break in the friendship between the two men, both stating that the other was unable to admit he could possibly be wrong.

Overview 
According to Jung, his work is an "extended commentary on a practical analysis of the prodromal stages of schizophrenia."

The analysis is of the Miller Fantasies; the fantasies of Miss Frank Miller, an American woman Jung did not know, but whose writings he had encountered in the work of Théodore Flournoy.

Jung wrote in his 1924 edition of the book that Miller's unusual name was a "pseudonym," which it was not. Miller, named for her father, was an Alabama-born performer and lecturer who often gave "speeches" in character as various cultural and historical figures. She published a few of her most vivid historic fantasies, with her own comments and impressions, in 1905 with an introduction by Flournoy. Jung explains their crucially significant mythological content and portending influence, declaring that Miller exhibited signs of "prodromal" stages of schizophrenia, and predicting that she would eventually suffer a schizophrenic breakdown. Jung was wrong; although Miller would indeed later receive psychiatric treatment, it was not for a diagnosis of schizophrenia.

The Miller Fantasies are included as an appendix in Symbols of Transformation.

Jung would later acknowledge that in closely delving into the Miller Fantasies, he was in fact—without admitting it to himself—trying to analyze the same critical questions about his own psyche.

References 

Works by Carl Jung
1912 non-fiction books
1916 non-fiction books
Books about the unconscious mind
Energy and instincts